Grevillea eriobotrya, commonly called the woolly cluster grevillea, is a species of flowering plant in the family Proteaceae and is endemic to a small area in the south-west of Western Australia. It is dense, erect, spreading shrub usually with linear leaves, and groups of white to creamy-white flowers.

Description
The edges of the leaves are rolled under and the upper surface has three to five longitudinal ridges.

Taxonomy
Grevillea eriobotrya was first formally described in 1876 by Ferdinand von Mueller in Fragmenta Phytographiae Australiae from specimens collected near Mount Churchman by Jess Young. The specific epithet (eriobotrya) means "a woolly raceme".

Distribution and habitat
Woolly cluster grevillea grows on sandplains amongst tall or medium trees in sandy soils in the Avon Wheatbelt, Coolgardie and Yalgoo IBRA regions.

See also
 List of Grevillea species

References

eriobotrya
Endemic flora of Western Australia
Eudicots of Western Australia
Proteales of Australia
Taxa named by Ferdinand von Mueller
Plants described in 1876